The 1996–97 Scottish League Cup was the 51st staging of Scotland's second most prestigious football knockout competition, also known for sponsorship reasons as the Coca-Cola Cup.

The competition was won by Rangers, who defeated Heart of Midlothian 4–3 in the final, played at Celtic Park.

First round

Second round

Third round

Quarter-finals

Semi-finals

Final

References

External links
 Scottish League Cup 1996/1997
 RSSSF–Scotland 1996–97

Scottish League Cup seasons
League Cup